Eilersen is a Nordic surname. It is related to Scandinavian family name etymology.

List of people with the surname 

 Eiler Eilersen Hagerup (1718–1789), Norwegian theologian
 Eiler Rasmussen Eilersen (1827–1912), Danish landscape painter
 Susanne Eilersen (born 1964), Danish politician

See also 
 Iversen (surname)
 Eilers

Surnames of Danish origin
Surnames of Norwegian origin